Sir Anthony Thomas Abdy, 5th Baronet, KC (c. 1720 – 7 April 1775) was a British barrister and Whig politician.

Background and education
He was the eldest son of Sir William Abdy, 4th Baronet (of the 1641 creation), and his wife Mary Stotherd, daughter of Philip Stotherd. Abdy was educated at Felsted School and went then to St John's College, Cambridge. In 1750, he succeeded his father as baronet and in 1759 also inherited the estates of Sir John Abdy, 4th Baronet, the great-grandchild of the brother of his great-grandfather. They included Albyns, in Stapleford Abbots, Essex, which he made his home.

Career
Abdy was admitted to Lincoln's Inn in 1738 and was called to the Bar after six years. He managed the estates of Sackville Tufton, 7th Earl of Thanet, and was adviser to Richard Boyle, 3rd Earl of Burlington. In 1758, he became a bencher and in 1765 he was appointed a King's Counsel. Along with the Countess of Burlington, Abdy was one of the witnesses to the marriage in June 1749 at the Portuguese Embassy Chapel in S. Audley St. London, of David Garrick and Eva Maria Veigel.

When in 1763 Sir Henry Slingsby, 5th Baronet, died, Abdy with the support of William Cavendish, 4th Duke of Devonshire, Burlington's son-in-law, stood as Member of Parliament (MP) for Knaresborough, a seat he held until his death in 1775.

Family and death
Having had suffered from the gout in his last years, Abdy died of it in 1775. On 13 August 1747, he had married Catherine Hamilton, youngest daughter of William Hamilton in St Paul's Cathedral in London. Their marriage was childless and Abdy was succeeded in the baronetcy by his younger brother William. The Albyns estate passed to his nephew, Thomas Abdy Rutherforth (1755–98) and his other property, including Chobham Place in Surrey, to William.

References

1720s births
1775 deaths
Alumni of St John's College, Cambridge
Baronets in the Baronetage of England
British MPs 1761–1768
British MPs 1768–1774
British MPs 1774–1780
Members of Lincoln's Inn
Members of the Parliament of Great Britain for English constituencies
People educated at Felsted School